Octave (foaled April 13, 2004, in Kentucky) is an American thoroughbred racehorse. She was sired by Unbridled's Song, who in turn was a son of 1990 Kentucky Derby winner Unbridled out of the Dr. Carter mare Belle Nuit.

Her only win as a two-year-old came in the Adirondack Breeders' Cup Stakes. She placed second to Dreaming of Anna in the Breeders' Cup Juvenile Fillies in 2006. Then Octave placed second to Rags to Riches in the Kentucky Oaks the following spring and finished second in the Fair Grounds Oaks and the Ashland Stakes.

After five consecutive second places, Octave started winning. After she took the Mother Goose Stakes and the Coaching Club American Oaks, in August, 2007, trainer Todd Pletcher entered her in the final jewel in the Triple Tiara, the 1-mile Alabama Stakes at Saratoga Race Course. Ridden by John Velazquez, Octave lost a stretch dual by Lady Joanne and Lear's Princess and finished third after a steward's inquiry upheld that Lady Joanne did not squeeze out Octave.

Octave's owners pledged v of her winnings from the Alabama Stakes to the Make-a-Wish Foundation for charity, according to co-owner Don Lucarelli.

On September 22, Octave ran in the $750,000 Grade II Fitz Dixon Cotillion Handicap at Philadelphia Park, where she placed second behind Bear Now, who wired the race. She then finished third in late October's Breeders' Cup Distaff, held in 2007 at Monmouth Park.

Resources
 Pedigree & Partial Stats
 Portion of Octave Alabama Earnings To Go To Charity

External links
 Octave has to work for first Grade I win
 Octave Scales New Heights in CCA Oaks

2004 racehorse births
Thoroughbred family 3-e
Racehorses bred in Kentucky
Racehorses trained in the United States